Timothy Raymond Mathieson (born 1957) is an Australian hairdresser and the former partner of Julia Gillard, former Prime Minister of Australia. He entered the public spotlight in 2006 when they became partners. Gillard was Deputy Leader of the Australian Labor Party at the time.

Early life and professional career
Mathieson was born and raised in Shepparton, Victoria. After leaving school he undertook a hairdressing apprenticeship in the Melbourne suburb of South Yarra. Returning to Shepparton, he operated a salon for fifteen years. Mathieson next moved to the Gold Coast, Queensland, where he operated a hair salon for a further fifteen years.

For much of the 1990s Mathieson and a friend worked in California, exporting vintage Levi's jeans and supplying marble interiors.

Returning to Melbourne in 2004, Mathieson worked for one year at a salon called Heading Out. There he met Gillard, a long-standing client of the salon. They began dating in March 2006 and became partners in 2007. After leaving Heading Out, Mathieson returned to Shepparton and established Tim Mathieson Hair with financial support from his father and brother. However, in 2006 he returned to Melbourne, where he worked as a sales representative for PPS Hairwear, a hair products company. In January 2010, Mathieson was appointed as a property agent for Ubertas Group, a Melbourne real estate agency, and focused on selling high-rise apartments in Melbourne to international buyers. Mathieson would remain in that role until March 2010.

After Julia Gillard became prime minister in June 2010, Mathieson supported her by assuming an unpaid, behind-the-scenes role, as well as continuing his involvement with charitable causes.

Charity work
On 24 November 2008 Nicola Roxon, the Minister for Health and Ageing, appointed Mathieson as one of the government's Men's Health Ambassadors, an unpaid role. Mathieson says he is passionate about his volunteer role. Mathieson is also an ambassador for Kidney Health Australia and a patron of the Australian Men's Sheds Association. He is also involved with the Indigenous Diabetes Association in Alice Springs and with mental health group beyondblue. In December 2010, Mathieson was appointed Patron of the National Portrait Gallery. The previous patrons were Thérèse Rein (wife of then prime minister Kevin Rudd) and Janette Howard (wife of then prime minister John Howard).

In January 2013, Mathieson attracted media attention for a joke he made while advocating for prostate examinations, advising men to seek out "a small Asian female doctor" when receiving a rectal prostate exam. His remark was considered inappropriate and in poor taste by some commentators. He later apologised "for any offence caused".

Personal life
Mathieson is a divorcé with three adult children. He was previously married to Diane Stark, with whom he had two children. Mathieson also fathered a daughter while in his late teens.

He started dating Julia Gillard in March 2006. When asked about marriage to Gillard, Mathieson said "We haven't talked about anything more than being spouses at this stage. Wait and see, I guess." Their relationship ended in 2021.

References

1957 births
Living people
Australian businesspeople
Australian expatriates in the United States
Australian hairdressers
Date of birth missing (living people)
People from Shepparton
Spouses of prime ministers of Australia